Playboy of Paris is a 1930 American pre-Code musical comedy film directed by Ludwig Berger and starring Maurice Chevalier, Frances Dee (in her film debut), and O.P. Heggie. It was based on a 1911 play The Little Cafe by Tristan Bernard which had previously been adapted into a 1919 French silent film. Paramount produced a separate French-language version Le Petit Café, also starring Chevalier, which broke records for an opening-day attendance in Paris.

The film introduced the song "My Ideal", composed by Richard A. Whiting and Newell Chase with lyrics by Leo Robin, which became a jazz standard.

Synopsis
Albert Loriflan, a waiter in a Paris cafe, unexpectedly inherits a large sum of money from a wealthy relative. His unscrupulous boss, Philibert, refuses to release him from his long-term contract in the hope that Albert will buy him off with a large payment. But Albert refuses, and continues to work at the cafe even though he is now very rich. Before long he falls in love with Philibert's daughter Yvonne.

Main cast
 Maurice Chevalier as Albert Loriflan 
 Frances Dee as Yvonne Phillbert 
 O.P. Heggie as Philibert 
 Stuart Erwin as Paul Michel 
 Eugene Pallette as Pierre Bourdin 
 Dorothy Christy as Mlle. Berengere 
 Cecil Cunningham as Mlle. Hedwige 
 Tyler Brooke as Cadeaux 
 William B. Davidson as Monsieur Bannack 
 Charles Giblyn as Gastonet

References

Bibliography
 Bradley, Edwin M. The First Hollywood Musicals: A Critical Filmography Of 171 Features, 1927 Through 1932. McFarland, 2004.

External links

1930 films
American musical comedy films
1930 musical comedy films
American multilingual films
Films directed by Ludwig Berger
American films based on plays
Paramount Pictures films
Films set in Paris
American black-and-white films
1930 multilingual films
Films scored by John Leipold
1930s English-language films
1930s American films